Ralf Waldmann (14 July 1966 – 10 March 2018) was a German Grand Prix motorcycle road racer.


Motorcycle racing career
In 1996, Waldmann finished second to Max Biaggi in the 250cc world championship. In the 1997 season, he gave Biaggi a strong challenge, winning four races and finishing only two points behind the Italian. Kenny Roberts offered him a job for the 1998 season on a 500cc Modenas but the competition was too strong and he finished in 14th place. He returned to the 250 class the following year riding for the Aprilia team and retired from motorcycle competition after the 2002 season. Waldmann came out of semi-retirement in 2003 and signed with the new Harris WCM MotoGP team, but quit before the year began after failing to adapt to the new four-stroke Grand Prix bikes.

His final win at the British Grand Prix in 2000 is of particular note. On a drying track, he came from nearly a whole lap down to win at the final corner at the notoriously slippery Donington Park circuit.

In 2009, he joined Martin Wimmer in buying out the motorbike manufacturing company MZ, from the Hong Leong Group. He also had a brief return to Grand Prix motorcycle racing, substituting for the injured rider Vladimir Leonov at the British Grand Prix.

Death
Waldmann died on 10 March 2018 in Ennepetal, Germany of a suspected heart attack at the age of 51.

Career statistics

Grand Prix motorcycle racing

By class

Races by year
(key) (Races in bold indicate pole position) (Races in italics indicate fastest lap)

Superbike World Championship

Races by year
(key) (Races in bold indicate pole position) (Races in italics indicate fastest lap)

References

1966 births
2018 deaths
Sportspeople from Hagen
German motorcycle racers
125cc World Championship riders
250cc World Championship riders
500cc World Championship riders
Superbike World Championship riders
80cc World Championship riders